Clatford railway station served the village of Goodworth Clatford, Hampshire, England, from 1865 to 1964 on the Sprat and Winkle Line.

History 
The station opened on 6 March 1865 by the London and South Western Railway. It closed on 7 September 1964. The edge of one of the platforms is the only thing that remains.

References

External links 

Disused railway stations in Hampshire
Former London and South Western Railway stations
Railway stations opened in 1865
Railway stations closed in 1964
1865 establishments in England
1964 disestablishments in England
Beeching closures in England
Railway stations in Great Britain opened in the 19th century